Deiontrez Mount (born February 26, 1993) is a former American football outside linebacker. He was drafted by the Tennessee Titans in the sixth round of the 2015 NFL Draft. He played college football for Louisville.

Professional career

Tennessee Titans
Mount was drafted by the Tennessee Titans in the sixth round, 177th overall, in the 2015 NFL Draft. On August 28, 2016, Mount was waived by the Titans.

Indianapolis Colts
On September 19, 2016, Mount was signed to the Colts' practice squad. He was promoted to the active roster on December 15, 2016.

On August 18, 2017, Mount was waived/injured by the Colts and placed on injured reserve. He was released on August 25, 2017.

Denver Broncos
On August 29, 2017, Mount signed with the Denver Broncos. He was waived on September 2, 2017 and was signed to the practice squad the next day. He was promoted to the active roster on November 15, 2017.

On May 30, 2018, Mount suffered a ruptured Achilles tendon during the Broncos' organized team activities (OTAs), and was ruled out the entire  season. He was waived/injured on June 11, 2018 and officially placed on injured reserve after clearing waivers.

Tampa Bay Vipers
Mount was selected by the Tampa Bay Vipers in round two of phase three of the 2020 XFL Draft. He had his contract terminated when the league suspended operations on April 10, 2020.

References

External links
 Louisville Cardinals bio
 Tennessee Titans bio

1993 births
Living people
People from Fort Walton Beach, Florida
Players of American football from Florida
American football outside linebackers
Louisville Cardinals football players
Tennessee Titans players
Indianapolis Colts players
Denver Broncos players
Tampa Bay Vipers players